Fruticicola is a genus of medium-sized, air-breathing land snails, which are terrestrial molluscs in the tribe Bradybaenini of the subfamily Bradybaeninae in the family Camaenidae. 

Species of snail in this genus create and use love darts prior to mating.

Species
Species within this genus include:
 Fruticicola alaica (Kuznetsov, 1998)
 Fruticicola almaatini (Skvortzov, 1940)
 Fruticicola bilaticincta (E. v. Martens, 1882)
 Fruticicola boevi (Uvalieva, 1967)
 Fruticicola cavimargo (E. v. Martens, 1879)
 Fruticicola dichrozona (E. v. Martens, 1885)
 Fruticicola fedtschenkoi (E. v. Martens, 1874)
 Fruticicola fruticum (Müller, 1774)
 Fruticicola helvola (Frivaldszky in L. Pfeiffer, 1853)
 Fruticicola intermedia (Rymzhanov, 1983)
 Fruticicola koreana (L. Pfeiffer, 1850)
 Fruticicola lantzi Lindholm, 1927
 Fruticicola perlucens (Rosen, 1901)
 Fruticicola phaeozona (E. v. Martens, 1874)
 Fruticicola plectotropis (E. v. Martens, 1864)
 Fruticicola schrenkii 	(Middendorff, 1851)
 Fruticicola scythica (Westerlund, 1898)
 Fruticicola sinistrorsa (Tzvetkov, 1938)
 Fruticicola skwortzowi Tzvetkov, 1940
 Fruticicola squamulosa (Izzatullaev & Schileyko, 1980)
 Fruticicola stoliczkana (Nevill, 1878)
 Fruticicola tomyris Lindholm, 1927
 Fruticicola transbaicalica (Schileyko, 1978)
 Fruticicola tzwetkovi (Uvalieva & Soboleva, 1973)
 Fruticicola zhecseni (Rymzhanov, 1979)

References

 Bank, R. A. (2017). Classification of the Recent terrestrial Gastropoda of the World. Last update: July 16th, 2017

External links
 Held, F. (1837-1838). Notizen über die Weichthiere Bayerns. Isis (Oken), 30 (4): 303-309 (1837); 30 (12): 901-919 (1838). Leipzig
 Hartmann, J.D.W. (1840-1844). Erd- und Süsswasser-Gasteropoden der Schweiz. Mit Zugabe einiger merkwürdigen exotischen Arten, i-xx, 1-36, pl. 1-2 [30-06-1840; 37-116, pl. 13-36 [1841]; 117-156, pl. 37-60 [1842]; 157-204, pl. 61-72 [1843]; 205-227, pl. 73-84 [1844]. St. Gallen.]

Camaenidae

pl:Zaroślarka pospolita
fi:Pensaskotilo